Bible Rock (Batalegala in the Sinhala language) is a mountain near the town of Aranayake in Kegalle District in central Sri Lanka. It derives its name "Bible rock" from its resemblance to a book on a lectern.

References

Mountains of Sri Lanka
Landforms of Kegalle District